WBDT (channel 26) is a television station licensed to Springfield, Ohio, United States, serving the Dayton area as a de facto owned-and-operated station of The CW. It is owned by Vaughan Media, which maintains a local marketing agreement (LMA) with Nexstar Media Group, owner of NBC affiliate WDTN (channel 2) and majority owner of The CW, for the provision of certain services. The two stations share studios on South Dixie Drive in Moraine (with a Dayton mailing address). Through a channel sharing agreement, WBDT, along with Richmond, Indiana–licensed Ion Television O&O WKOI-TV (channel 43), share WDTN's digital channel from WDTN's transmitter facility on Frytown Road in southwest Dayton.

WBDT serves as the default CW affiliate for the Lima market, which had been served by cable-only affiliate West Central Ohio CW until early 2010.

History

Prior history of channel 26

Channel 26 first appeared in southwest Ohio on July 14, 1968, as independent WSWO-TV, under the ownership of Southwestern Ohio Television. WSWO-TV ran a local live version of Bozo the Clown (portrayed by announcer Dave Eaton, who was previously with the former WKTR-TV in Kettering, now PBS member station WPTD [channel 16]), as well as other local shows. The station suddenly went dark on June 19, 1970, after it lost a bid to obtain the ABC affiliation for Dayton to WKEF (channel 22); it soon thereafter filed for bankruptcy.

WSWO-TV briefly returned to the air on June 17, 1972, under the ownership of Lester W. White, but fell silent again at the beginning of December after White defaulted on a loan. White was additionally discovered to have stolen equipment from multiple television stations, most notably WHIZ-TV in Zanesville, and arrested two days before a court ordered the station closed.

Current license
The current incarnation of channel 26 dates from September 7, 1980, when Miami Valley Christian Television (MVCT) returned it to the air as a Christian-oriented station under the call sign WTJC (for "Witnessing 'Til Jesus Comes"). WTJC aired religious programming during most of its daytime and weekend schedule (including The 700 Club, PTL and Jerry Falwell) although it also aired lifestyle programming such as The Joy of Gardening, cartoons, and children's programming in late weekday afternoon slots (including The Rocky and Bullwinkle Show, Porky Pig, The Great Space Coaster and New Zoo Revue). There were also family-friendly reruns in early evenings (among them Leave It to Beaver, Sergeant Preston of the Yukon and Lassie) and a local newscast. WTJC's Saturday schedule included westerns, sportsmen/hunting/wildlife shows (including Wild Kingdom) and The Lawrence Welk Show.

When WRGT-TV signed on in 1984, MVCT sold most of its secular programming inventory to that station, and switched WTJC to a mostly-religious format (with the exception of a few children's shows, and Saturday morning sporting and hunting shows). Over the next few years, several ministries that bought time on WTJC became involved in scandals. Due to the scandals, donations to the ministries, and to MVCT, declined. The primary owner of MVCT, Marvin Sparks, bought out his partners' shares in 1991 and in turn sold them to Video Mall Communications. WTJC then aired home shopping and paid programming eighteen hours a day, with religious shows the rest of the broadcast day.

In the mid-1990s, Abry Communications (which had purchased WRGT-TV's owner, Act III Broadcasting) approached MVCT with a proposal to manage WTJC for 18 hours a day. MVCT declined and chose instead to sell the station to Paxson Communications in 1995. Paxson kept a similar lineup for WTJC, airing religious programming in early mornings, infomercials for most of the day and worship music overnight. On January 20, 1998, WTJC's call sign was changed to WDPX (for "Dayton Pax TV"). Accordingly, on August 31 of that year, the station became a charter affiliate of Pax (now Ion Television).

In June 1999, Paxson sold the station to ACME Communications, which dropped half of Pax's programming for a primary affiliation with The WB, along with syndicated programming. The previous WB affiliate was  station WUCT-LP (now WRCX-LD); WB programming in the Dayton area could also be seen on the WGN cable channel and on Columbus WB affiliate WWHO. On June 9, 1999, ACME also changed WDPX's call sign to the current WBDT. ACME ran the station as a dual WB and Pax affiliate, signing a five-year affiliation deal with Pax upon the sale of the station from Paxson. As a dual WB and Pax affiliate, WBDT aired a mix of syndicated programming, WB network programming, and Pax TV programming (such as Touched by an Angel, Diagnosis Murder, Encounters with the Unexplained, Promised Land, Mysterious Ways, and later Doc and Candid Camera). WBDT maintained a secondary affiliation with Pax until mid-2004 at the latest, airing its prime time lineup on weekday mornings from 9 a.m. to noon, early Sunday mornings from 1 to 4 a.m., and early Monday mornings from midnight to 4 a.m. In the station's early days as a WB affiliate, Pax's flagship Touched by an Angel continued to air at its regularly scheduled time of 7:00 p.m., leading into WB prime time programming. In 2004, Diagnosis Murder was moved to 1 p.m., while the remainder of Pax's programming was moved to overnights. The station finally dropped the remainder of Pax's programming in September 2004, filling the morning hours previously programmed with the network's programming with off-network sitcoms, talk shows, infomercials, and court shows.

On September 18, 2006, WBDT became the market's CW outlet after The WB and UPN merged. It became a strong affiliate with the new network in terms of prime time ratings—strong enough for The CW to designate WBDT the "#1 CW affiliate" in the nation in March 2007. In that same month, the station became the first in the area (and one of the few in the entire country) to broadcast in a 1080i high definition 16:9 format 24 hours a day, broadcasting on digital UHF channel 18.

On June 4, 2010, it was announced that the LIN TV Corporation (owner of WDTN) would begin to operate WBDT through shared service and joint sales agreements.  WBDT was to leave its longtime studios on Corporate Place, off Byers Road in Miamisburg, in October and move to WDTN's facility in Moraine. As of January 27, 2013, the former WBDT studio facility is now occupied by Sinclair Broadcast Group's duopoly of ABC affiliate WKEF and Fox affiliate WRGT-TV (the move made them the last network-affiliated stations in Dayton to have upgraded their local programming, including newscasts, to high definition).

Three months after ACME and LIN TV reached their operations and sales agreements, LIN TV exercised an option to purchase WBDT along with another LIN TV-operated ACME station, fellow CW affiliate WCWF in Green Bay, Wisconsin. LIN TV requested that WBDT's license be assigned to a subsidiary of Vaughan Media (owner of Austin, Texas CW affiliate KNVA, which is also operated by LIN TV). LIN TV holds a 4.5% equity stake in Vaughan Media, but controls most of that company's voting stock, effectively making it a shell corporation for LIN TV. The FCC approved the sale and license transfer in April 2011; the commission also denied objections from area cable operators Time Warner Cable and Buckeye Cablevision, who claimed that retransmission fees for WBDT would increase as a result of the sale.  The sale of WBDT was consummated on May 20, 2011.

On March 4, 2011, LIN TV's contract with Dish Network expired, and all TV stations owned or operated by LIN, including both WBDT and WDTN, were pulled from Dish. On March 13, LIN and Dish entered into a retransmission consent agreement, and all affected channels were restored.

On March 21, 2014, Media General announced that it would purchase LIN Media and its stations, including WDTN and the SSA and JSA with WBDT, in a $1.6 billion merger. The FCC approved the merger on December 12, 2014, but a condition of the deal requires Media General to end the JSA between WBDT and WDTN due to tighter scrutiny such deals are getting by the FCC. Media General received a two-year waiver to end the JSA between WDTN and WBDT. The merger was completed on December 19.

A carriage dispute with Dish Network, beginning at 7:00 p.m. on December 2, 2020, resulted in the removal of WBDT and sister station WDTN from the platform, along with 164 Nexstar stations in 115 markets.

Newscasts

On September 16, 2002, the nationally syndicated morning show, The Daily Buzz, premiered from WBDT's studios. The program, then produced by then-parent ACME Communications, remained based at the station until its August 2004 move to the facilities of former sister station WKCF in Lake Mary, Florida near Orlando.

On August 18, 2007, WDTN began to produce a nightly half-hour prime time newscast for WBDT known as 2 News at 10 on Dayton's CW. On the 26th day of its broadcast, this show achieved higher ratings than WRGT-TV's nightly prime time news (produced by WKEF) in Dayton's metered market households.

On July 21, 2012, WDTN began broadcasting its local newscasts in high definition. The WBDT shows were included in the upgrade.

On January 7, 2013, WBDT began airing a weekday news program from 7:00 to 9:00 a.m., called 2 News Today on Dayton's CW. Since the cancellation of The Daily Buzz, the station also simulcasts the 5:00 to 7:00 a.m. WDTN edition as well. On September 9, 2013, WBDT expanded the prime time 10:00 p.m. WDTN-produced newscast to an hour.

Technical information

Subchannels
The station's digital signal is multiplexed:

Analog-to-digital conversion
WBDT shut down its analog signal, over UHF channel 26, on June 12, 2009, the official date in which full-power television stations in the United States transitioned from analog to digital broadcasts under federal mandate. The station's digital signal relocated from its pre-transition UHF channel 18 to channel 26 for post-transition operations.

Initially, WBDT aired a standard definition simulcast of its HD programming on its DT2 subchannel. After several months, this subchannel was dropped. On September 26, 2011, WBDT began airing Bounce TV on DT2, becoming a charter affiliate of the network. On November 30, 2015, WBDT added a third subchannel to carry Ion Television (the network was also added by other Media General stations); the station had carried Pax, the forerunner of Ion Television, as a secondary affiliate, ending in 2004. On February 1, 2018, Ion Television was moved to sister station WDTN's DT3 subchannel, replacing the Justice Network; WBDT's third subchannel was dropped.

Spectrum reallocation
On April 14, 2017, it was reported that WBDT's over-the-air spectrum had been sold in the FCC's spectrum reallocation auction, fetching $27.3 million, with the FCC listing the station as set to go off the air. However, Joe Abouzeid, president and general manager of the station, characterized the auction as an "engineering exercise" and stated that the station would not go off the air or move to a new channel.

In spite of the station manager's earlier denial, WBDT began sharing sister station WDTN's digital channel on June 29, 2018. Through the use of PSIP, digital television receivers display the station's virtual channel as its former UHF analog channel 26.

See also

Channel 26 virtual TV stations in the United States
Channel 31 digital TV stations in the United States
List of television stations in Ohio 
List of television stations in Ohio (by channel number)
List of television stations in the United States by call sign (initial letter W)

References

External links
Dayton's CW

BDT
The CW affiliates
Bounce TV affiliates
Television channels and stations established in 1980
1980 establishments in Ohio
Nexstar Media Group